The 9th government of Turkey (1 November 1937 – 11 November 1938) was a government in the history of Turkey. It is also called first Bayar government.

Background 
The government was formed after İsmet İnönü, the previous prime minister, resigned. It was founded by Celal Bayar of the Republican People's Party (CHP).

The government
In the list below, the  cabinet members who served only a part of the cabinet's lifespan are shown in the column "Notes".

Aftermath
On 10 November 1938, the president Mustafa Kemal Atatürk died, and the next day, İsmet İnönü was elected as the new president. According to custom, the government was dismissed, but the next government was also founded by Celal Bayar.

References

09
Republican People's Party (Turkey) politicians
1937 establishments in Turkey
1938 disestablishments in Turkey
Cabinets established in 1937
Cabinets disestablished in 1938
Members of the 9th government of Turkey
5th parliament of Turkey
Republican People's Party (Turkey)